The Southern Star is a local newspaper for Brisbane in Australia. It is owned and run by the Quest Community Newspapers group.

External links
 
Quest Community Newspapers

News Corp Australia
Newspapers published in Brisbane
Publications with year of establishment missing